Scott Douglas Bean (born 27 January 1976) is a former Zimbabwean cricketer. Born in Salisbury (now Harare), he is a right-handed batsman and a right-arm medium pace bowler. In 1995, he played five first-class matches for Mashonaland Under-24s / Young Mashonaland in the Logan Cup.

References

External links
 
 

1976 births
Living people
Cricketers from Harare
Mashonaland cricketers
Zimbabwean cricketers